Ston Easton is a linear village and civil parish in the English county of Somerset. The parish includes the hamlet of Clapton.

History

The name Ston Easton comes from Easton or Estone, meaning town to the east of Chewton Mendip, and Ston or Stone from the geological strata in the area.

To the north of the village is a round barrow tumulus.

The village existed before the Norman Conquest and after 1066 was given to the Bishop of Coutances for his lifetime. In the reign of Henry III the manor was held by the family De Clifton who remained the lords until the reign of Edward III. By 1340 it had been divided into two manors. One was held by Simon de Trewhouse and the other by Bruton Abbey who held it until the dissolution of the monasteries when it was granted to John Hippisley.

The parish was part of the hundred of Chewton.

Ston Easton Park, a former country house noted for its Palladian architecture, built circa 1769 for John Hippisley Coxe, on a 17th-century foundation of which some fragments survive, is now a hotel and Grade I Listed building.

Governance

The parish council has responsibility for local issues, including setting an annual precept (local rate) to cover the council's operating costs and producing annual accounts for public scrutiny. The parish council evaluates local planning applications and works with the local police, district council officers, and neighbourhood watch groups on matters of crime, security, and traffic. The parish council's role also includes initiating projects for the maintenance and repair of parish facilities, as well as consulting with the district council on the maintenance, repair, and improvement of highways, drainage, footpaths, public transport, and street cleaning. Conservation matters (including trees and listed buildings) and environmental issues are also the responsibility of the council.

The village falls within the Non-metropolitan district of Mendip, which was formed on 1 April 1974 under the Local Government Act 1972, having previously been part of Clutton Rural District, which is responsible for local planning and building control, local roads, council housing, environmental health, markets and fairs, refuse collection and recycling, cemeteries and crematoria, leisure services, parks, and tourism.

Somerset County Council is responsible for running the largest and most expensive local services such as education, social services, libraries, main roads, public transport, policing and fire services, trading standards, waste disposal and strategic planning.

It is also part of the Wells county constituency represented in the House of Commons of the Parliament of the United Kingdom. It elects one Member of Parliament (MP) by the first past the post system of election.

Religious sites

The Church of St Mary The Virgin is a grade II* listed building dating from the 11th century, with a 15th-century embattled three-stage west tower. It was much rebuilt at the end of the 19th century, by Blomfield.

The most striking interior feature is the Norman chancel arch, with semi-circular head and colonettes. The pews, choir stalls, altar rails, pulpit, font and screen are all 19th-century. There are several 18th- and 19th-century wall monuments.

Notable residents

 The geologist John Beaumont lived here.
 Jacob Rees-Mogg, the MP representing the North East Somerset constituency, though he was born in Hammersmith, grew up in Ston Easton.
William Rees-Mogg, Editor for The Times lived in Ston Easton with his wife and children.

References

External links

 Ston Easton Village website

Villages in Mendip District
Civil parishes in Somerset